Tommi Juhani Häti (born April 11, 1971 in Helsinki) is a Finnish male curler.

He competed at the 2002 Winter Olympics where the Finnish men's curling team placed fifth.

He started curling in 1987 at the age of 17.

Teams

References

External links
 

Living people
1971 births
Sportspeople from Helsinki
Finnish male curlers
Olympic curlers of Finland
Curlers at the 2002 Winter Olympics
European curling champions
Finnish curling champions